Owtrang is a village in Senderk Rural District, Senderk District, Minab County, Hormozgan Province, Iran. At the 2006 census, its population was 26, in 4 families.

References 

Populated places in Minab County